The 2009 North Carolina Tar Heels baseball team represented University of North Carolina at Chapel Hill in the 2009 NCAA Division I baseball season. The Tar Heels played their home games at Boshamer Stadium. The team was coached by Mike Fox in his 11th year as head coach at North Carolina.

The Tar Heels won the Chapel Hill Regional and the Chapel Hill Regional Super Regional to advance to the College World Series, where they were defeated by the Arizona State Sun Devils.

Roster

Schedule

|-
! style="" | Regular Season
|-

|-
! bgcolor="#DDDDFF" width="3%" | #
! bgcolor="#DDDDFF" width="7%" | Date
! bgcolor="#DDDDFF" width="14%" | Opponent
! bgcolor="#DDDDFF" width="25%" | Site/Stadium
! bgcolor="#DDDDFF" width="5%" | Score
! bgcolor="#DDDDFF" width="5%" | Overall Record
! bgcolor="#DDDDFF" width="5%" | ACC Record
|- align="center" bgcolor="#ccffcc"
| 1 || February 20 ||  || Boshamer Stadium • Chapel Hill, North Carolina || 13–3 || 1–0 || –
|- align="center" bgcolor="#ccffcc"
| 2 || February 21 || VMI || Boshamer Stadium • Chapel Hill, North Carolina || 6–0 || 2–0 || –
|- align="center" bgcolor="#ccffcc"
| 3 || February 22 || VMI || Boshamer Stadium • Chapel Hill, North Carolina || 11–3 || 3–0 || –
|- align="center" bgcolor="#ffcccc"
| 4 || February 24 ||  || Boshamer Stadium • Chapel Hill, North Carolina || 3–7 || 3–1 || –
|- align="center" bgcolor="#ccffcc"
| 5 || February 25 ||  || Boshamer Stadium • Chapel Hill, North Carolina || 9–5 || 4–1 || –
|- align="center" bgcolor="#ccffcc"
| 6 || February 27 ||  || Boshamer Stadium • Chapel Hill, North Carolina || 5–1 || 5–1 || –
|- align="center" bgcolor="#ccffcc"
| 7 || February 27 || Seton Hall || Boshamer Stadium • Chapel Hill, North Carolina || 4–3 || 6–1 || –
|- align="center" bgcolor="#ccffcc"
| 8 || February 28 || Seton Hall || Boshamer Stadium • Chapel Hill, North Carolina || 10–3 || 7–1 || – 
|-

|-
! bgcolor="#DDDDFF" width="3%" | #
! bgcolor="#DDDDFF" width="7%" | Date
! bgcolor="#DDDDFF" width="14%" | Opponent
! bgcolor="#DDDDFF" width="25%" | Site/Stadium
! bgcolor="#DDDDFF" width="5%" | Score
! bgcolor="#DDDDFF" width="5%" | Overall Record
! bgcolor="#DDDDFF" width="5%" | ACC Record
|- align="center" bgcolor="#ccffcc"
| 9 || March 4 ||  || Boshamer Stadium • Chapel Hill, North Carolina  || 10–3 || 8–1 || –
|- align="center" bgcolor="#ffcccc"
| 10 || March 6 || Clemson || Boshamer Stadium • Chapel Hill, North Carolina || 4–5 || 8–2 || 0–1
|- align="center" bgcolor="#ccffcc"
| 11 || March 7 || Clemson || Boshamer Stadium • Chapel Hill, North Carolina || 5–2 || 9–2 || 1–1
|- align="center" bgcolor="#ccffcc"
| 12 || March 8 || Clemson || Boshamer Stadium • Chapel Hill, North Carolina || 9–8 || 10–2 || 2–1
|- align="center" bgcolor="#ccffcc"
| 13 || March 10 ||  || Boshamer Stadium • Chapel Hill, North Carolina || 9–8 || 11–2 || 2–1
|- align="center" bgcolor="#ccffcc"
| 14 || March 11 || Appalachian State || Boshamer Stadium • Chapel Hill, North Carolina || 12–3 || 12–2 || 2–1
|- align="center" bgcolor="#ccffcc"
| 15 || March 13 || at  || English Field • Blacksburg, Virginia || 7–3 || 13–2 || 3–1
|- align="center" bgcolor="#ccffcc"
| 16 || March 15 || at Virginia Tech || English Field • Blacksburg, Virginia || 13–5 || 14–2 || 4–1
|- align="center" bgcolor="#ccffcc"
| 17 || March 17 ||  || Boshamer Stadium • Chapel Hill, North Carolina || 17–0 || 15–2 || 4–1
|- align="center" bgcolor="#ccffcc"
| 18 || March 18 || Princeton || Boshamer Stadium • Chapel Hill, North Carolina || 6–1 || 16–2 || 4–1
|- align="center" bgcolor="#ccffcc"
| 19 || March 20 ||   || Boshamer Stadium • Chapel Hill, North Carolina || 8–5 || 17–2 || 5–1
|- align="center" bgcolor="#ffcccc"
| 20 || March 21 || Duke || Boshamer Stadium • Chapel Hill, North Carolina || 4–5 || 17–3 || 5–2
|- align="center" bgcolor="#ffcccc"
| 21 || March 22 || Duke || Boshamer Stadium • Chapel Hill, North Carolina || 9–10 || 17–4 || 5–3
|- align="center" bgcolor="#ccffcc"
| 22 || March 24 || at  || Brooks Field • Wilmington, North Carolina || 8–1 || 18–4 || 5–3
|- align="center" bgcolor="#ffcccc"
| 23 || March 25 ||  || Boshamer Stadium • Chapel Hill, North Carolina || 1–2 || 18–5 || 5–3
|- align="center" bgcolor="#ccffcc"
| 24 || March 27 || Virginia || Boshamer Stadium • Chapel Hill, North Carolina || 4–3 || 19–5 || 6–3
|- align="center" bgcolor="#ffcccc"
| 25 || March 28 || Virginia || Boshamer Stadium • Chapel Hill, North Carolina || 2–5 || 19–6 || 6–4
|- align="center" bgcolor="#ccffcc"
| 26 || March 29 || Virginia || Boshamer Stadium • Chapel Hill, North Carolina || 6–5 || 20–6 || 7–4
|- align="center" bgcolor="#ccffcc"
| 27 || March 31 ||  || Boshamer Stadium • Chapel Hill, North Carolina || 9–4 || 21–6 || 7–4
|-

|-
! bgcolor="#DDDDFF" width="3%" | #
! bgcolor="#DDDDFF" width="7%" | Date
! bgcolor="#DDDDFF" width="14%" | Opponent
! bgcolor="#DDDDFF" width="25%" | Site/Stadium
! bgcolor="#DDDDFF" width="5%" | Score
! bgcolor="#DDDDFF" width="5%" | Overall Record
! bgcolor="#DDDDFF" width="5%" | ACC Record
|- align="center" bgcolor="#ccffcc"
| 28 || April 1 || Old Dominion || Boshamer Stadium • Chapel Hill, North Carolina || 7–6 || 22–6 || 7–4
|- align="center" bgcolor="#ccffcc"
| 29 || April 3 || at  || Russ Chandler Stadium • Atlanta, Georgia || 4–2 || 23–6 || 8–4
|- align="center" bgcolor="#ffcccc"
| 30 || April 4 || at Georgia Tech || Russ Chandler Stadium • Atlanta, Georgia || 6–10 || 23–7 || 8–5
|- align="center" bgcolor="#ccffcc"
| 31 || April 5 || at Georgia Tech || Russ Chandler Stadium • Atlanta, Georgia || 13–10 || 24–7 || 9–5
|- align="center" bgcolor="#ccffcc"
| 32 || April 7 ||  || Boshamer Stadium • Chapel Hill, North Carolina || 3–1 || 25–7 || 9–5
|- align="center" bgcolor="#ccffcc"
| 33 || April 8 ||  || Boshamer Stadium • Chapel Hill, North Carolina || 12–8 || 26–7 || 9–5
|- align="center" bgcolor="#ffcccc"
| 34 || April 10 || at  || Mike Martin Field at Dick Howser Stadium • Tallahassee, Florida || 2–3 || 26–8 || 9–6
|- align="center" bgcolor="#ccffcc"
| 35 || April 11 || at Florida State || Mike Martin Field at Dick Howser Stadium • Tallahassee, Florida || 12–7 || 27–8 || 10–6
|- align="center" bgcolor="#ffcccc"
| 36 || April 12 || at Florida State || Mike Martin Field at Dick Howser Stadium • Tallahassee, Florida || 8–9 || 27–9 || 10–7
|- align="center" bgcolor="#ffcccc"
| 37 || April 14 ||  || Boshamer Stadium • Chapel Hill, North Carolina || 9–11 || 27–10 || 10–7
|- align="center" bgcolor="#ccffcc"
| 38 || April 15 ||  || Boshamer Stadium • Chapel Hill, North Carolina || 20–4 || 28–10 || 10–7
|- align="center" bgcolor="#ccffcc"
| 39 || April 17 ||  || Boshamer Stadium • Chapel Hill, North Carolina || 3–0 || 29–10 || 11–7
|- align="center" bgcolor="#ccffcc"
| 40 || April 18 || Miami (FL) || Boshamer Stadium • Chapel Hill, North Carolina || 5–4 || 30–10 || 12–7
|- align="center" bgcolor="#ccffcc"
| 41 || April 19 || Miami (FL) || Boshamer Stadium • Chapel Hill, North Carolina || 4–1 || 31–10 || 13–7
|- align="center" bgcolor="#ccffcc"
| 42 || April 21 || UNC Wilmington || Boshamer Stadium • Chapel Hill, North Carolina || 7–5 || 32–10 || 13–7
|- align="center" bgcolor="#ffcccc"
| 43 || April 22 || at East Carolina || Clark–LeClair Stadium • Greenville, North Carolina || 0–4 || 32–11 || 13–7
|- align="center" bgcolor="#ccffcc"
| 44 || April 24 ||  || Boshamer Stadium • Chapel Hill, North Carolina || 7–4 || 33–11 || 14–7
|- align="center" bgcolor="#ccffcc"
| 45 || April 25 || Maryland || Boshamer Stadium • Chapel Hill, North Carolina || 14–3 || 34–11 || 15–7
|- align="center" bgcolor="#ccffcc"
| 46 || April 26 || Maryland || Boshamer Stadium • Chapel Hill, North Carolina || 4–2 || 35–11 || 16–7

|-
! bgcolor="#DDDDFF" width="3%" | #
! bgcolor="#DDDDFF" width="7%" | Date
! bgcolor="#DDDDFF" width="14%" | Opponent
! bgcolor="#DDDDFF" width="25%" | Site/Stadium
! bgcolor="#DDDDFF" width="5%" | Score
! bgcolor="#DDDDFF" width="5%" | Overall Record
! bgcolor="#DDDDFF" width="5%" | ACC Record
|- align="center" bgcolor="#ccffcc"
| 47 || May 5 ||  || Boshamer Stadium • Chapel Hill, North Carolina || 15–6 || 36–11 || 16–7
|- align="center" bgcolor="#ccffcc"
| 48 || May 7 ||  || Boshamer Stadium • Chapel Hill, North Carolina || 5–4 || 37–11 || 16–7
|- align="center" bgcolor="#ffcccc"
| 49 || May 8 || at  || Doak Field • Raleigh, North Carolina || 0–3 || 37–12 || 16–8
|- align="center" bgcolor="#ccffcc"
| 50 || May 9 || at NC State || Doak Field • Raleigh, North Carolina || 5–2 || 38–12 || 17–8
|- align="center" bgcolor="#ffcccc"
| 51 || May 10 || at NC State || Doak Field • Raleigh, North Carolina || 4–9 || 38–13 || 17–9
|- align="center" bgcolor="#ccffcc"
| 52 || May 12 || at Charlotte || Robert and Mariam Hayes Stadium • Charlotte, North Carolina || 4–1 || 39–13 || 17–9
|- align="center" bgcolor="#ffcccc"
| 53 || May 14 || at  || Eddie Pellagrini Diamond • Chestnut Hill, Massachusetts || 1–3 || 39–14 || 17–10
|- align="center" bgcolor="#ccffcc"
| 54 || May 15 || at Boston College || Eddie Pellagrini Diamond • Chestnut Hill, Massachusetts || 16–10 || 40–14 || 18–10
|- align="center" bgcolor="#ccffcc"
| 55 || May 16 || at Boston College || Eddie Pellagrini Diamond • Chestnut Hill, Massachusetts || 8–1 || 41–14 || 19–10
|-

|-
! style="" | Postseason
|-

|-
! bgcolor="#DDDDFF" width="3%" | #
! bgcolor="#DDDDFF" width="7%" | Date
! bgcolor="#DDDDFF" width="14%" | Opponent
! bgcolor="#DDDDFF" width="25%" | Site/Stadium
! bgcolor="#DDDDFF" width="5%" | Score
! bgcolor="#DDDDFF" width="5%" | Overall Record
! bgcolor="#DDDDFF" width="5%" | ACC Record
|- align="center" bgcolor="#ccffcc"
| 56 || vs May 20 || vs Duke || Durham Bulls Athletic Park • Durham, North Carolina || 8–3 || 42–14 || 19–10
|- align="center" bgcolor="#ffcccc"
| 57 || vs May 22 || vs Virginia || Durham Bulls Athletic Park • Durham, North Carolina || 1–11 || 42–15 || 19–10
|- align="center" bgcolor="#ffcccc"
| 58 || vs May 23 || vs Florida State || Durham Bulls Athletic Park • Durham, North Carolina || 3–4 || 42–16 || 19–10
|-

|-
! bgcolor="#DDDDFF" width="3%" | #
! bgcolor="#DDDDFF" width="7%" | Date
! bgcolor="#DDDDFF" width="14%" | Opponent
! bgcolor="#DDDDFF" width="25%" | Site/Stadium
! bgcolor="#DDDDFF" width="5%" | Score
! bgcolor="#DDDDFF" width="5%" | Overall Record
! bgcolor="#DDDDFF" width="5%" | ACC Record
|- align="center" bgcolor="#ccffcc"
| 59 || vs May 29 ||  || Boshamer Stadium • Chapel Hill, North Carolina || 5–2 || 43–16 || 19–10
|- align="center" bgcolor="#ccffcc"
| 60 || vs May 30 || Coastal Carolina || Boshamer Stadium • Chapel Hill, North Carolina || 14–5 || 44–16 || 19–10
|- align="center" bgcolor="#ccffcc"
| 61 || vs May 31 ||  || Boshamer Stadium • Chapel Hill, North Carolina || 7–3 || 45–16 || 19–10
|-

|-
! bgcolor="#DDDDFF" width="3%" | #
! bgcolor="#DDDDFF" width="7%" | Date
! bgcolor="#DDDDFF" width="14%" | Opponent
! bgcolor="#DDDDFF" width="25%" | Site/Stadium
! bgcolor="#DDDDFF" width="5%" | Score
! bgcolor="#DDDDFF" width="5%" | Overall Record
! bgcolor="#DDDDFF" width="5%" | ACC Record
|- align="center" bgcolor="#ccffcc"
| 62 || vs June 6 || East Carolina || Boshamer Stadium • Chapel Hill, North Carolina || 10–1 || 46–16 || 19–10
|- align="center" bgcolor="#ccffcc"
| 63 || vs June 7 || East Carolina || Boshamer Stadium • Chapel Hill, North Carolina || 9–3 || 47–16 || 19–10
|-

|-
! bgcolor="#DDDDFF" width="3%" | #
! bgcolor="#DDDDFF" width="7%" | Date
! bgcolor="#DDDDFF" width="14%" | Opponent
! bgcolor="#DDDDFF" width="25%" | Site/Stadium
! bgcolor="#DDDDFF" width="5%" | Score
! bgcolor="#DDDDFF" width="5%" | Overall Record
! bgcolor="#DDDDFF" width="5%" | ACC Record
|- align="center" bgcolor="#ffcccc"
| 64 || June 14 || vs Arizona State || Johnny Rosenblatt Stadium • Omaha, Nebraska || 2–5 || 47–17 || 19–10
|- align="center" bgcolor="#ccffcc"
| 65 || June 16 || vs  || Johnny Rosenblatt Stadium • Omaha, Nebraska || 11–4 || 48–17 || 19–10
|- align="center" bgcolor="#ffcccc"
| 66 || June 18 || vs LSU || Johnny Rosenblatt Stadium • Omaha, Nebraska || 5–12 || 48–18 || 19–10
|-

|-
|

Awards and honors
Dustin Ackley
First Team All-American American Baseball Coaches Association
First Team All-American Baseball America
First Team All-American Collegiate Baseball Newspaper
First Team All-American National Collegiate Baseball Writers Association
First Team All-Atlantic Region American Baseball Coaches Association
National Player of the Year Rivals.com
First Team All-ACC
Atlantic Coast Conference Player of the Year
College World Series All-Tournament Team

Levi Michael
Freshman All-American Collegiate Baseball Newspaper
Second Team Freshman All-American National Collegiate Baseball Writers Association

Brian Moran
Third Team All-American Baseball America
Second Team All-ACC

Kyle Seager
First Team All-ACC
College World Series All-Tournament Team

Adam Warren
Second Team All-ACC

Alex White
First Team All-ACC
Second Team All-Atlantic Region American Baseball Coaches Association

References

North Carolina Tar Heels baseball seasons
North Carolina Tar Heels baseball
College World Series seasons
North Carolina
Atlantic Coast Conference baseball champion seasons